Ctenogobiops is a genus of marine gobies native to the Indian and Pacific oceans.

They commonly live on sandy sea beds and are often found sharing burrows with small shrimp.

Species
There are currently nine recognized species in this genus:
 Ctenogobiops aurocingulus (Herre, 1935) (Gold-streaked prawn-goby)
 Ctenogobiops crocineus J. L. B. Smith, 1959
 Ctenogobiops feroculus Lubbock & Polunin, 1977 (Sandy prawn-goby)
 Ctenogobiops formosa J. E. Randall, K. T. Shao & J. P. Chen, 2003
 Ctenogobiops maculosus (Fourmanoir, 1955) (Seychelles shrimpgoby)
 Ctenogobiops mitodes J. E. Randall, K. T. Shao & J. P. Chen, 2007
 Ctenogobiops pomastictus Lubbock & Polunin, 1977 (Gold-specked prawn-goby)
 Ctenogobiops tangaroai Lubbock & Polunin, 1977 (Tangaroa shrimpgoby)
 Ctenogobiops tongaensis J. E. Randall, K. T. Shao & J. P. Chen, 2003

References

 
Gobiinae